Housatonic Meadows State Park is a public recreation area covering  along the Housatonic River in the towns of Sharon and Cornwall, Connecticut. The state park offers opportunities for camping, hiking, picnicking, canoeing, and fly-fishing. It is crossed by the Appalachian Trail and is managed by the Connecticut Department of Energy and Environmental Protection.

References

External links
Housatonic Meadows State Park Connecticut Department of Energy and Environmental Protection
Housatonic Meadows State Park Map Connecticut Department of Energy and Environmental Protection

State parks of Connecticut
Parks in Litchfield County, Connecticut
Sharon, Connecticut
Cornwall, Connecticut
Protected areas established in 1927
1927 establishments in Connecticut